Laurence Peters (13 June 1916 – 29 July 2011) was an  Australian rules footballer who played with Hawthorn in the Victorian Football League (VFL).

Notes

External links 

1916 births
2011 deaths
Australian rules footballers from Melbourne
Hawthorn Football Club players
People from Kew, Victoria